Cruise for the Unknown One is a French film from 1948, directed by Pierre Montazel, written by Pierre Montazel, and starring Claude Dauphin. Louis de Funès had an uncredited role. The film was based on the novel of G. Vidal L'aventure est à bord.

Cast 
 Claude Dauphin as Clément Fournil
 Sophie Desmarets as Marianne Fabre
 Pierre Brasseur as Emile Fréchisse
 Noël Roquevert as Kohlmann
 Albert Rémy as Albert
 Edmond Ardisson as inspector
 Louis de Funès as (uncredited)

References

External links 
 

1948 films
1940s French-language films
French black-and-white films
Films directed by Pierre Montazel
Seafaring films
Gaumont Film Company films
French comedy films
1948 comedy films
1940s French films